The 1500 meters distance for women in the 2016–17 ISU Speed Skating World Cup will be contested over six races on six occasions, out of a total of World Cup occasions for the season, with the first occasion taking place in Harbin, Canada, on 11–13 November 2016, and the final occasion taking place in Stavanger, Norway, on 11–12 March 2017.

The defending champion is Brittany Bowe of United States.

Top three

Race medallists

Standings

References 

Women 1500
ISU